The 2023 New Zealand Women's National League is the third scheduled season of the new National League since its restructuring in 2021; the 2021 National League was cancelled due to the COVID-19 pandemic in northern regions. The 2023 season will be the twenty-first season of national women's football and will again be a hybrid season. The competition will feature four teams from the Northern League representing the Northern Conference, Central Football and two Capital Football federation sides representing the Central Conference, and Canterbury United Pride and Southern United representing the Southern Conference.

Qualifying league

2023 NRFL Premiership
Eight teams are competing in the league – the top seven teams from the previous season and the promoted side from the 2022 NRF Championship. The promoted team is Hibiscus Coast as winners of the NRF Championship. They replaced Tauranga City.

Teams

NRFL Premiership table

NRFL Premiership results table

Qualified teams

Championship phase

League table

See also
 2023 New Zealand National League (men's)

References

External links
Official website

2022
football
Women
Women
New Zealand, Women
Scheduled association football competitions